Personal file of Judge Ivanova is a 1985 Soviet drama film directed by Ilya Frez.

Plot 
The film tells about Judge Ivanova everything was wonderful until her husband met his daughter's music teacher and fell in love with her.

Cast 
 Natalya Gundareva as Lyubov Grigoryevna Ivanova
 Sergey Shakurov as Sergey Ivanov
 Oksana Datskaya as Lena Ivanova
 Liliya Gritsenko as Lyubov's mother
 Marina Zudina as Olga Nikolaevna
 Tatyana Pelttser as Anna Nikolaevna
 Aleksey Guskov as Volodya Klimov
 Aristarkh Livanov as Stranger
 Larisa Grebenshchikova as Nilina
 Anna Belyuzhenko as Nilina's daughter (as Anya Belyuzhenko)

References

External links 
 

1985 films
1980s Russian-language films
Soviet drama films
1985 drama films